Eucalyptus rossii, commonly known as inland scribbly gum or white gum, is a species of small to medium-sized tree that is endemic to New South Wales and the Australian Capital Territory. It has smooth bark with insect scribbles, lance-shaped adult leaves, flower buds in groups of between nine and fifteen, white flowers and hemispherical or shortened spherical fruit.

Description
The smooth yellowish bark sheds in patches throughout the year and usually has insect scribbles.

Flowering occurs between September and February and the flowers are white.

Taxonomy
Eucalyptus rossii was first formally described in 1902 by the botanist Richard Thomas Baker and chemist Henry George Smith in A Research on the Eucalypts especially in regard to their Essential Oils. The specific epithet (rossii) honours William John Clunies-Ross (1850-1914), for his attention to the flora of the Bathurst region.

Distribution and habitat
Inland scribbly gum has a scattered distribution over the New South Wales tablelands, western slopes and the central coast, from Tenterfield in the north to Bombala in the south. The trees grow well in sandy and stony well-drained soils, usually on slopes. They are part of open dry sclerophyll woodland communities and associated species include E. haemastoma and E. racemosa.

Ecology
These trees usually have scribble marks on the bark formed by the burrowing larvae of a small moth, Ogmograptis scribula. The insect lays eggs within layers of bark and when the larvae hatch they burrow into the bark.

Use in horticulture
E. rossii is available commercially in seed form or as seedlings. It is useful as a shade tree which grows well in full sun with well drained soils that can cope in poor shallow, stony soils. It is both drought and frost tolerant with a flower display through summer that will attract birds.

See also
List of Eucalyptus species

References

rossii
Flora of New South Wales
Flora of the Australian Capital Territory
Plants described in 1902
Trees of Australia
Myrtales of Australia
Taxa named by Richard Thomas Baker